Then and Now is a 1973 studio album by American country music artists, and father-and-son team, Doc Watson and Merle Watson. The album won the Grammy Award for Best Ethnic or Traditional Folk Recording in 1974.

In 1984, Sugar Hill records re-issued versions—which excluded some tracks—of both Then and Now and Two Days in November. BGO Records released both, with additional tracks from The Elementary Doctor Watson!, in 2002.

Reception

Writing for Allmusic, music critic Lindsay Palmer called the Watsons' style an "inimitable blend of acoustic folk and traditional country" and wrote "Their somewhat stylized selection of material is derived not only from the traditional genres, but also from the Watsons' native southeastern United States and its rich Piedmont blues heritage. The results are uniformly brilliant..."

Track listing
 "Bonaparte's Retreat" (Pee Wee King, Redd Stewart) – 2:02
 "Milk Cow Blues" (Kokomo Arnold) – 2:16
 "Bottle of Wine" (Tom Paxton) – 2:06
 "Match Box Blues" (Blind Lemon Jefferson) – 3:33
 "If I Needed You" (Townes Van Zandt) – 2:36
 "Frankie and Johnny" (Traditional) – 3:09
 "That's All" (Merle Travis) – 2:58
 "Corrina, Corrina" (Traditional) – 2:49
 "Meet Me Somewhere in Your Dreams" (Cook) – 1:58
 "Old Camp Meetin' Time" (Traditional) – 2:11
 "Rain Crow Bill" (Traditional) – 1:30

Personnel
Doc Watson – guitar, harmonica, vocals
Merle Watson – guitar, banjo
Norman Blake – dobro
Vassar Clements – fiddle
Bobby Seymour – pedal steel guitar
Joe Allen – bass
Kenny Malone – percussion

Production notes
Produced by Jack Clement
Executive producer – Kevin Eggers
Mastered by Paul Zinman
Design by Milton Glaser
Photography by Mike Salisbury

References

External links
  Doc Watson discography

1973 albums
Doc Watson albums
Albums produced by Jack Clement
Tomato Records albums
Albums with cover art by Milton Glaser
Grammy Award for Best Ethnic or Traditional Folk Recording